The 2018 UCLA Bruins baseball team represented the University of California, Los Angeles in the 2018 NCAA Division I baseball season as a member of the Pac-12 Conference. The team was coached by John Savage and played their home games at Jackie Robinson Stadium.

Previous season

The Bruins finished 30–27 overall, and 19–11 in the conference. During the season, the Bruins were invited and participated in the Dodger Stadium Classic in Los Angeles, California. UCLA defeated Michigan to earn 3rd place. In the postseason, the Bruins were invited and participated in the 2017 NCAA Division I baseball tournament, where they lost to San Diego State and Texas in the Long Beach Regional in Long Beach, California.

MLB draft selections

The Bruins had six individuals selected in the 2017 MLB draft.

Roster

Schedule

References

UCLA
UCLA Bruins baseball seasons
UCLA
UCLA